The 2019 Rinnai 250 was a NASCAR Xfinity Series race held on February 23, 2019, at Atlanta Motor Speedway in Hampton, Georgia. Contested over 163 laps on the 1.54-mile-long (2.48 km) asphalt quad-oval intermediate speedway, it was the second race of the 2019 NASCAR Xfinity Series season.

Entry list

Practice

First practice

Final practice

Qualifying
Qualifying was canceled due to rain. The starting lineup was determined by 2018 owner's points, meaning Cole Custer was awarded the pole for the race.

Qualifying results

Race

Stage Results

Stage One
Laps: 40

Stage Two
Laps: 40

Final Stage Results

Stage Three
Laps: 83

References

Rinnai
NASCAR races at Atlanta Motor Speedway
Rinnai 250
2019 NASCAR Xfinity Series